Yolande Bonhomme (c. 1490–1557) was a French printer and seller of liturgical and devotional books in Paris. She was among a handful of important female book printers in Paris during this time, including Charlotte Guillard, Francoise Louvain and Marie L'Angelier.

She was the daughter of Pasquier Bonhomme, himself a printer and one of four appointed booksellers of the University of Paris, and the wife of another printer, Thielmann Kerver. She began printing on her own following her husband's death in 1522. Estimates of her output range from 136 (according to Axel Erdmann) to 200 (according to Beatrice Beech, based on Renouard) publications before her own death in 1557. Because she often used her husband's name on the colophon for early books, her identity as the printer can be difficult to pinpoint. The University of Paris and the Catholic Church are counted among her patrons. She published a book of hours in 1523 and another in 1546; both books survive. In 1526, she became the first woman to publish the Bible. She also published the Roman Breviary (Latin: Breviarium Romanum) in 1534 and a Breviarium Romanum nuper reformatum in 1537. She joined forces with Charlotte Guillard to demand better quality paper from the papermakers' guild.

See also
 List of women printers and publishers before 1800

References

Further reading
 Beech, Beatrice Hibbard,"Yolande Bonhomme: a Renaissance printer", Medieval prosopography 6.2, 1985. 
 Beech, Beatrice Hibbard, "Women Printers in Paris in the Sixteenth Century," Medieval Prosopography: 10.1, 1989 
 Axel Erdmann, My gracious silence: women in the mirror of 16th century printing in Western Europe, 1999.

1490s births
1557 deaths
Printers from Paris
French booksellers
Women printers
16th-century French businesswomen
16th-century printers